Bina-Etawa, often shortened as Bina, is a city in the Bina-Etawa district in the Indian state of Madhya Pradesh. The name Bina-etawa derived from the Bina river flowing through nearby the city, except this 4 more river's are flowing through the surrounding area of city, they are Motichur(famous Katra temple of the city situated oñ this river), Betwa (separate the borders of Bina and Ashoknagar district), Narayani(Naren Between Bina and Lalitpur), Silar etc. The city is an important center of economic and industrial activities for the state; a major oil refinery (Bina Refinery, formerly operated by BORL) is located in Bina. This region is known for its high quality wheat, which is exported internationally. 

Bina also contains an important railway junction. The routes from Delhi-Mumbai, Lucknow-Chennai, Jhansi-Ujjain and Katni-Kota pass through Bina Railway Junction.

Bina is situated near many sites of cultural and historical interest, which include Bhopal (the capital of Madhya Pradesh), Vidisha (old bhelsha ancient city), Sanchi (the stupa of king Ashoka), Chanderi (the silk sarees of Chanderi), Malhargarh (Jain pilgrims) and Rahatgarh (known for its waterfall on Bina river).

Bina-Etawa is close to the ancient city of Eran, which was situated nearby along the bank of the Bina River. Eran was the capital of Airikina Pradesha or Airikina Vishaya, an administrative division of the Gupta empire. This city is also the centre point of Bhopal (capital of M.P.)and Jhansi (gateway of Bundelkhand), because of its location.
It is among the oldest cities found in the region and is the oldest City of MP.

History

Bina was formerly known as Etawa, the name of the village earlier present in the area. In 1923, the Bina Railway Junction was founded, with its name derived from the Bina River that flows nearby.
The First MLA of this Vidhansabha was Ram Lal Nayak from INC.
 The new name was chosen to remove any ambiguity between Itawa (located in Uttar Pradesh) and Etawa. Later, administrative documents began using the name Bina-Etawa, which led to the renaming of the city as Bina-Etawa.

Located near the city, the Khimlasa Fort is a location of significant historical interest. Khimlasa Fort is said to have been founded by a Mohammedan noble, and was the mahal in the sarkar of Raisen of the subah of Malwa. The town of Khimlasa is enclosed within a fortified wall built of stone rubble.

Industry and economics

Bharat Oman Refinery Limited owns a major oil refinery near Bina, "the only petroleum refinery in Central India [with a capacity of] 7.8 MMTPA." Bina Refinery has adopted technologies designed to process Arab Mix crude (65% Arab Light and 35% Arab Heavy). It also had the flexibility to process other types of Middle East crude. The project also includes a Coke-based Captive Cogeneration Power Plant of 99 MW (33 x 3).

Bina Thermal Power Plant is also under construction. A section of the power plant currently operates with a capacity of 500 MW, although this will scale up to 1200 MW when the plant reaches full capacity. The construction of a cement manufacturing plant has been proposed by the JAYPEE group in Bina. A 1200kV National Test Station is also located in Bina.

The regional government of Madhya Pradesh plans to build an investment corridor between Bina and Bhopal, naming it the Bina-Bhopal Investment Corridor. Through this project, investment of around $1 billion (USD) is expected to upgrade local industry, subsidising the production of electrical equipment, fabricated metal, machinery, and equipment. Along with it, integrated township projects were also proposed near the city. Bina's first solar power plant, which will be used for operating railway trains and also in the lightning system for Bina junction, was also established in 2020.
The Memu (Mainline electric multiple unit) Car Shed for operating local Memu trains in Madhya Pradesh and nearby states are also established in Bina Junction by WCR zone Bhopal division for smooth transportation of railway trains in this area in 2021.

The region is also home to agricultural produce processing units and agricultural machinery manufacturing plants.

Geography

Bina-Etawa is situated at 24°10’ N latitude and 78°10’ E longitude at about 412 m above sea level. The Bina (river), India and Betwa Rivers are the major sources of water in the area. The agricultural land consists primarily of black soil.

Climate

The winter season lasts from November until the middle or late February and the summer season lasts from March until mid-June. The minimum temperature recorded in the city is 1 °C in January. The maximum temperature is 48.0 °C. Average precipitation is around 1235/mm annually. In the monsoon season, the wind direction is from south-west; in winter the wind direction is normally from the northeast of the city.

Education
Bina-Etawa has an average literacy rate of 73%, higher than the national average. Bina has two important centers for higher education: a government college for post-graduate and graduate courses and a government girls college, providing graduate courses for girls. Kendriya Vidyalaya and Nirmal Jyoti Senior Secondary School are two important high schools in the region. Three state government Schools provide education for the city's students. Some private schools also operate in the city.

Religious sites

The main religious site in Bina-Etawa is the Shri Katara Swami, a temple of Lord Hanuman.

The city is home to several temples and other historical sites. There are many Hindu's temple like Jatashankar temple, Gayatri temple, Moti Maharaj temple, Shani Dev temple, Hare Ram temple, Maruti Hanuman temple, Panchmukhi temple (Nai basti), Bhuteshwar Mahadev temple & Kund-kund Digambar jain temple (Sindhi colony). Jains and Hindus are the majority population in the area. Nisai Ji, a Hindu temple, is located near the bank of river Betwa. The shrine of Shri Taaran Taran, founder of Taaran Taran Panth of Jainism, is located at this place.

Anekant Gyan Mandir, a Jain organisation, preserves some of the oldest manuscripts related to Jainism (electronic copies for these manuscripts were also created by the organisation). Shrutdham temple for Jain religion is also an attraction/picnic spot in the outskirts of City. Maa Jageshwari Shaktipeeth is known for the temple of Goddess Durga. A Saibaba Mandir is also located on the campus of Maa Jageshwari Shaktipeeth. Some important religious events include the Annual Palki Yatra of Maa Jageshwari, organised on the first day of Navratri. The Sai Baba Palki Yatra is organised on the 14th of February every year.

In popular culture
Some scene's of Raj Kapoor's Bollywood movie Teesri Kasam (1966) was filmed at or nearby this town.

See also 

 Bina Junction railway station

References

Sagar, Madhya Pradesh
Cities and towns in Sagar district